The 1942 Cal Aggies football team represented the College of Agriculture at Davis—now known as the University of California, Davis—as a member of the Far Western Conference (FWC) during the 1942 college football season. Led by sixth-year head coach Vern Hickey, the Aggies compiled an overall record of 1–6 with a mark of 0–2 in conference play, placing last out of three teams in the FWC. The team was outscored by its opponents 79 to 51 for the season. The Cal Aggies played home games at A Street field on campus in Davis, California. Like many other college football team, the Aggies did not play in the 1943 to 1945 seasons due to World War II.

Schedule

Notes

References

Cal Aggies
UC Davis Aggies football seasons
Cal Aggies football